Aaron Ekblad (born February 7, 1996) is a Canadian professional ice hockey defenceman and alternate captain for the Florida Panthers in the National Hockey League (NHL). Ekblad was selected first overall in the 2011 Ontario Hockey League (OHL) entry draft, and he was selected first overall by the Florida Panthers in the 2014 NHL Entry Draft and made his NHL debut that year. In his first NHL season, Ekblad was selected for the 2015 NHL All-Star Game and earned the Calder Memorial Trophy as the league's best rookie in the 2014–15 season.

Prior to joining the NHL, Ekblad played major junior hockey for the Barrie Colts in the Ontario Hockey League. He was granted "Exceptional Player" status unanimously by Hockey Canada, thus allowing him to play major junior a year early. Ekblad has played more games and scored more points than any other defenseman in Florida Panthers franchise history.

Playing career

Amateur
 
In 2010–11, Ekblad competed for the Sun County Panthers minor midget AAA team in Belle River, Ontario. He had 34 points in 30 regular season games and added 21 points in 18 playoff games. He captained the team and lead them to an alliance championship.

Ekblad's application to be the only player born in 1996 in the CHL draft was approved unanimously, after a six-week review by Hockey Canada. With the approval, Ekblad became the first defenceman ever granted "exceptional player" status. The status allowed him to compete in the Canadian Hockey League a year earlier than his eligible age. The only other players to have been given such eligibility are centre John Tavares in 2005, Connor McDavid in 2012, Sean Day in 2013, Joe Veleno in 2015, Shane Wright in 2019, and Connor Bedard in 2020.  

In the 2014 OHL Coaches Poll, the results of which were released in Toronto, he won top honours in four different categories in the Eastern Conference of the Ontario Hockey League, earning first-place finishes for best shot, hardest shot, best offensive defenceman, and best defensive defenceman. He was also voted second in the category of best penalty killer, behind Oshawa Generals forward Scott Laughton.

Professional

Florida Panthers
Ekblad was selected first overall in the 2014 NHL Entry Draft by the Florida Panthers on June 27, 2014. He subsequently signed his first NHL contract on September 3, a three-year, entry-level deal with the Panthers. After making the Panthers' opening night roster out of training camp for the 2014–15 season, Ekblad made his NHL debut on October 9 against the Tampa Bay Lightning. In the game, he scored his first career NHL point, an assist on a Jonathan Huberdeau goal, in Florida's eventual 3–2 loss in overtime. Ekblad later scored his first career NHL goal on November 1 against Steve Mason of the Philadelphia Flyers in a 2–1 Panthers win.

On December 6, in a game against the Buffalo Sabres, Ekblad scored a career-high three points in a 3–2 Panthers victory, the first Panthers rookie to record a three-point game since Dan Boyle during the 1998–99 season. Ekblad was also named the game's first star for his performance. On January 23, 2015, Ekblad was named as an injury replacement for Colorado Avalanche defenceman Erik Johnson at the 2015 NHL All-Star Game in Columbus, Ohio. In the Game, Ekblad recorded four assists in Team Toews' 17–12 victory over Team Foligno.

Ekblad finished his rookie season with 12 goals and 27 assists (39 points) in 81 games played for Florida. Following the conclusion of his rookie season, Ekblad led all rookie defensemen in goals, power play goals (6), power play points (13), shots (170) and fewest shot attempts against per 60 minutes (38.04). He also finished second in assists, plus-minus (+12), hits (109) and blocked shots (80), while also averaging 21:48 of ice time per game. Ekblad also set a new franchise record for rookie defensemen in goals, assists, and points, surpassing Ed Jovanovski. On April 23, Ekblad was named one of three finalists for the Calder Memorial Trophy — awarded annually to the NHL's rookie of the year — along with the Ottawa Senators' Mark Stone and Calgary Flames' Johnny Gaudreau. On June 24, 2015, Ekblad was announced as the Calder winner.

During the following season, Ekblad missed four games in January to recover from a concussion he had endured from a hit delivered by Edmonton Oilers Matt Hendricks. Hendricks was suspended three games for the hit.

On July 2, 2016, Ekblad and the Panthers agreed to an eight-year, $60 million extension. He was also named an alternate captain. During the 2016–17 season, Ekblad suffered another concussion during a game against the Tampa Bay Lightning and missed four games.

On February 3, 2018, Ekblad became the 15th defenseman in NHL history to reach double-digits in goals in each of his first four seasons.

On March 28, 2021, Ekblad was stretchered off the ice following a collision with Dallas Stars' defenseman Esa Lindell. He underwent surgery to repair a left leg fracture the following day and was ruled out for 12 weeks, effectively ending his season.

On March 18, 2022, Ekblad recorded three assists in a 5–3 loss against the Vegas Golden Knights, giving him 291 career points, the most by a defenseman in the franchise history of the Panthers, surpassing Robert Svehla. On December 16, Ekblad played his 574th NHL game, a 4–2 loss to the Pittsburgh Penguins, surpassing Svehla for most games played by a defenseman in Panthers' history.

International play

During Team Canada junior team's training camp in August 2014 in preparation for the upcoming 2015 World Junior Ice Hockey Championships in December 2014, Ekblad suffered a concussion in an exhibition game against the Czech Republic.

Ekblad played for Canada at the 2015 World Championships, where they won the gold medal for the first time since 2007 with a perfect 10-0 record.

Ekblad was invited to the play for Team North America at the 2016 World Cup of Hockey. Team North America was a newly formed team  that consisted of hockey players aged 23 or younger. He was later named an alternate captain along with Sean Couturier. During the tournament, he suffered an upper body injury and had to leave the team early.

On April 12, 2018, Ekblad was named to Team Canada's senior team to compete at the 2018 IIHF World Championship.

Personal life
Ekblad's brother Darien, a goaltender, was drafted into the OHL by the London Knights. Aaron Ekblad attended Innisdale Secondary School and was an honour roll student in the Simcoe County District School Board. Ekblad was born in Windsor, but grew up in Belle River, Ontario. His great-grandfather was Swedish, hence the last name "Ekblad".

During his rookie year Ekblad lived with veteran Willie Mitchell and his wife Megan.

On July 30, 2022, Ekblad married his longtime girlfriend, Dayna Mastronardi, in Miami Beach.

Career statistics

Regular season and playoffs

International

Awards and honours

References

External links
 
 

1996 births
Living people
Barrie Colts players
Calder Trophy winners
Canadian ice hockey defencemen
Canadian people of Swedish descent
Florida Panthers draft picks
Florida Panthers players
Ice hockey people from Ontario
National Hockey League All-Stars
National Hockey League first-overall draft picks
National Hockey League first-round draft picks
People from Essex County, Ontario
Sportspeople from Windsor, Ontario
Canadian expatriate ice hockey players in the United States